Lee Jin-Haeng (born 10 July 1971) is a South Korean footballer.

Honours

Club 
 Suwon Samsung Bluewings
K-League (2): 1998, 1999
K-League Cup (3): 1999, 1999S, 2000
Super Cup (2): 1999, 2000

Individual 
 K-League Best XI (1): 1997

References

External links 
 
 FIFA Player Statistics

1971 births
Living people
Association football midfielders
South Korean footballers
Suwon Samsung Bluewings players
K League 1 players
Footballers at the 1992 Summer Olympics
Olympic footballers of South Korea
Yonsei University alumni